San Antonio is a village in Buenaventura Municipality, Valle del Cauca Department in Colombia. It is surrounded by a very dense tropical rainforest.

Climate
San Antonio has an extremely wet tropical rainforest climate (Af). It is one of the wettest places in the department of Valle del Cauca and one of the wettest in Colombia and in the world.

References

Populated places in the Valle del Cauca Department